Laracy is a surname. Notable people with the surname include:

 Darina Laracy (1917–2003), Irish journalist and translator
 Michael James Laracy (1871–1952), New Zealand shearer and trade unionist